Ye Shanghai is a live album by artist Roberto Paci Dalò, recorded as a live 5.1 performance in ORF Funkhaus Studio, Austrian Broadcasting Corporation in Wien, for Kunstradio programme and distributed by Soundohm. Beneath the album, the homonym project related to the history of the Shanghai Ghetto.

Background
Sonic materials are the Chinese song of the 30s Ye Shanghai (Shanghai nights) played by Zhou Xuan, sampled and rebuilt, and samples from archive materials from the years between 1933 and 1949, voices in English, Yiddish, Chinese, German. To these, live instrumental and electronic sounds.
The album was presented in Venice on the 10th of November 2014 at the Bevilacqua La Masa Foundation.

Reception

-Carlo Boccadoro, Internazionale 06.01.2015 

-Clocktower Radio NY 

-Rachel Marsden, Rachel Marsden's Words blog 14.09.2012 

-Lorenza Ghinelli, Carmilla 23.01.2015 

-Stefania Mazzotti, gagarin orbite culturali 31.01.2015

Track listing

Personnel 
 Bass clarinet, sampler & electronics - Roberto Paci Dalò
 Sound Engineers - Elmart Peinelt, Suzanne Wirtitsch 
 Kunstradio Producer - Elisabeth Zimmermann 
 Design: Roberto Paci Dalò

Credits
 Mastered at Farmhouse Studio Rimini by Andrea Felli
 First performance: September 6, 2012, SH Contemporary - Shanghai Contemporary Art Fair; commissioned by Massimo Torrigiani
 First broadcasting: January 13, 2013, ORF Kunstradio, Vienna 
 Published by L’Arte dell’Ascolto 
 Production: Marsèll Records, Arthub, Giardini Pensili

Marsèll Records, Marsèll001

References 

2014 live albums